The FC Germania Friedrichstal is a German association football club from Friedrichstal, Baden-Württemberg.

The club achieved its greatest success in 2014 when it earned promotion to the Oberliga Baden-Württemberg for the first time.

History
FC Germania Friedrichstal was formed on 23 November 1913. Because of the effects of the First World War the club had to withdraw from football soon after, in 1915. After the war the club restarted in the lowest possible division, the local C-Klasse but had to withdraw from league football once more from 1925 to 1928. FC even had to leave the Southern German Football Association because of financial troubles caused by the hyperinflation in Germany. Upon returning to competitive football the club played in the local C and B-Klasse again until 1939 when the Second World War brought football to a halt again.

On 1 January 1946 the club once more reformed but now adopted the name Sportfreunde Friedrichstal. In 1947 Sportfreunde resumed league football, now joining the A-Klasse and, in 1951, the club returned to its pre-war name FC Germania Friedrichstal. After playing in local amateur football for the most part of its history FC won promotion to the 2. Amateurliga Mittelbaden in 1968, finishing runners-up in its first season there. In 1972 a division title in the 2. Amateurliga earned the club promotion to the Amateurliga Nordbaden for the first time, the third tier of German football.

At this level Germania struggled, narrowly avoiding relegation in its first year but coming last in its second and dropping back down to the 2. Amateurliga. In 1975 the village of Friedrichstal together with four other villages amalgamated to form the municipality of Stutensee. It was also decided by the local football clubs to hold an annual Stutenseepokal, a local cup competition. In 1978 the club won the 2. Amateurliga once more and thereby qualified for the Verbandsliga Baden, the new fourth tier of local football, below the also newly introduced Oberliga Baden-Württemberg. FC Germania would play the next twelve seasons in the Verbandsliga.

The first couple of seasons in the Verbandsliga Germania spend as a lower table side but, from 1982, performances improved, culminating with a third-place finish in 1984–85. In the same year the team also reached the final of the Baden Cup but lost to SV Sandhausen. After 1986 however the club started to decline and was eventually relegated in 1990.

By the late 1980s the club was financially struggling, having to pay off depth. The seasons immediately after being relegated from the Verbandsliga Germania almost suffered another relegation but narrowly managed to stay in the Landesliga for the time. In this time youth player Jens Nowotny left the club to join near-by Karlsruher SC and eventually rise to become a German international. In 1993 the club dropped out of the Landesliga down to the Bezirksliga and, in the following season, to the A-Klasse. It took the club until 1999 to recover from this and return to the Bezirksliga. In 2001–02 the club was back in the Landesliga for a season but suffered immediate relegation. It returned to the Landesliga in 2004 and finished runners-up in its first season back. The following year it won the league and returned to the Verbandsliga.

Germania played the next eight seasons in the Verbandsliga. In 2009–10 it finished runners-up in the league but failed in the promotion round to the Oberliga. It got another change for Oberliga promotion in 2013–14, when it came third in the Verbandsliga but runners-up FC Astoria Walldorf II declined the option to play in the promotion round. Germania, in its place, was successful against SV Linx and SV Göppingen and earned promotion to the Oberliga Baden-Württemberg for the first time. After two Oberliga seasons as a lower table side Friedrichstal was relegated in 2016.

Honours
The club's honours:

League
 Verbandsliga Baden (VI)
 Runners-up: 2010
 2. Amateurliga Mittelbaden (IV)
 Champions: 1972, 1978
 Landesliga Mittelbaden (VI)
 Champions: 2006
 Runners-up: 2005

Cup
 Baden Cup
 Runners-up: 1985

Recent seasons
The recent season-by-season performance of the club:

With the introduction of the Regionalligas in 1994 and the 3. Liga in 2008 as the new third tier, below the 2. Bundesliga, all leagues below dropped one tier.

Key

References

External links
 Official team site  
 Das deutsche Fußball-Archiv  historical German domestic league tables
 FC Germania Friedrichstal at Weltfussball.de 

Football clubs in Germany
Football clubs in Baden-Württemberg
Association football clubs established in 1913
1913 establishments in Germany